Judy Saluria is a retired Filipino footballer who played for the Philippines national football team.

Career
Saluria plated for Philippine Army F.C. and was a frequent member of the Philippines national football team as a defender. He was part of the squad that played in the 1991 Southeast Asian Games.

He would also feature in the 1996 AFF Championship in Singapore. Saluria was offered money to match fix a game against Singapore. He was told to let his side concede seven goals. He rejected the offer and in coordination with coach Hans Smit and Singaporean authorities, got involved in the arrest of three match-fixers.

Saluria would become an assistant coach of Arellano University's football team under his brother Ravelo.

International goals
Scores and results list the Philippines' goal tally first.

Personal life
Saluria hails from from Barotac Nuevo and was an enlisted personnel of the Philippine Army. He has four brothers with his father Segundo Saluria Sr., a policeman, responsible for setting up the first football team in Cotabato.

References

Filipino footballers
Philippines international footballers
Footballers from Iloilo
Philippine Army personnel